Al-Merreikh Al-Thagher Sport Club also known as Merreikh Port Sudan is a football club in Port Sudan, Sudan.

National
Sudan Premier League
Champion (0):
Runners-up (0):
Third Place (1): 2000
 12 Place (1):2007

Sudan Cup
Champion (0):
Runners-up (0):

Bort Sudan League

Performance in CAF competitions
CAF Cup: 1' appearance
2001 – First Round

External links
Team profile – soccerway.com''

Football clubs in Sudan
Red Sea (state)